Zavadovsky (feminine: Zavadovskaya) is a Russian-language surname, a Russianized for of the polish surname Zawadowski. An alternative spelling is Zavadovskiy.
Notable people with this surname include:
Boris Zavadovsky (1895-1951), Russian physiologist
Gennady Zavadovsky, an alleged dead Soviet cosmonaut
, second in command of the sloop-of-war Vostok in the First Russian Antarctic Expedition, the namesake of two islands
Mikhail Mikhailovich Zavadovsky (1891–1957), Russian-Soviet biologist
Pyotr Zavadovsky (1739–1812), Russian statesman, a favourite and lover of Russian Empress Catherine the Great
Vera Zavadovskaya, Russian courtier, maid of honour to empress Catherine the Great

See also
Zavadovskiy Island
Zavodovski Island

Russian-language surnames